An Evening With Wally Londo Featuring Bill Slaszo is the seventh album released by George Carlin, released in October 1975. It was also included as part of the 1999 The Little David Years (1971–1977) box set.

Track listing

Notes
 Carlin mentioned the album's release when he hosted the first episode of Saturday Night Live.
 The "Baseball-Football" bit can be frequently heard at the National Baseball Hall of Fame Museum in Cooperstown, New York.
 In his autobiography, Last Words, Carlin stated that he hated the title of this album due to himself being "put on the bill" with two other people, although he did not explain the background of the two names in the title, or why the names were placed in the title.
 In a 2001 interview with Mark Pitta, the album is brought up and Carlin remarks "I thought that was a very clever name for an album." Discussion then turns to the track "Teenage Masturbation" and no more is said of the title.

References

1970s comedy albums
1975 live albums
George Carlin live albums
Stand-up comedy albums
Spoken word albums by American artists
Live spoken word albums
Little David Records live albums